was an ethnographer, a pioneer in participation of remote Nepalese villagers in researching their problems, resulting in practical benefits of portable water supplies and rapid rope-way transport across mountain gorges. He was awarded the Ramon Magsaysay Award in 1984.

He is reported as the author of KJ method for organizing notes, also termed affinity walls in UX Research.  He viewed the method as an alternative to Western quantitative methods in ethnography.

References

1920 births
2009 deaths
Japanese expatriates in Nepal